Rose Terrace is a street of Georgian architecture in the Scottish city of Perth, Perth and Kinross, dating to at least the late 18th century. It is named for Rose Anderson, the wife of former Perth lord provost Thomas Hay Marshall, who donated the land. The couple lived at the corner of Rose Terrace and Atholl Street.

Overlooking the southwestern edge of the North Inch, one of Perth's two large parks, Rose Terrace is the home of the Old Academy, a Category A listed building, built between 1803 and 1807. It was the home of Perth Academy between 1807 and 1932.

Map

Notable buildings and structures

Below is a selection of notable buildings and structures on Rose Terrace, ordered from south to north. All six are listed buildings at Historic Environment Scotland.

2 Atholl Street (corner property)
1–5 Rose Terrace
Old Academy, 6–7 Rose Terrace
8–12 Rose Terrace
13–16 Rose Terrace
17 Rose Terrace

References

Streets in Perth, Scotland
Georgian architecture in Scotland
18th-century establishments in Scotland